The Nakagami distribution or the Nakagami-m distribution is a probability distribution related to the gamma distribution. The family of Nakagami distributions has two parameters: a shape parameter  and a second parameter controlling spread .

Characterization 
Its probability density function (pdf) is

where 

Its cumulative distribution function is

where P is the regularized (lower) incomplete gamma function.

Parametrization 

and

Parameter estimation 

An alternative way of fitting the distribution is to re-parametrize  and m as σ = Ω/m and m.

Given independent observations  from the Nakagami distribution, the likelihood function is

 

Its logarithm is

 

Therefore

 
These derivatives vanish only when
 
and the value of m for which the derivative with respect to m vanishes is found by numerical methods including the Newton–Raphson method.

It can be shown that at the critical point a global maximum is attained, so the critical point is the maximum-likelihood estimate of (m,σ). Because of the equivariance of maximum-likelihood estimation, one then obtains the MLE for Ω as well.

Generation 
The Nakagami distribution is related to the gamma distribution.

That is, a Nakagami random variable  is generated by a simple scaling transformation on a Chi-distributed random variable  as below.

For a Chi-distribution, the degrees of freedom  must be an integer, but for Nakagami the  can be any real number greater than 1/2. This is the critical difference and accordingly, Nakagami-m is viewed as a generalization of Chi-distribution, similar to a gamma distribution being considered as a generalization of Chi-squared distributions.

History and applications 

The Nakagami distribution is relatively new, being first proposed in 1960.  It has been used to model attenuation of wireless signals traversing multiple paths and to study the impact of fading channels on wireless communications.

Related distributions 
 Restricting m to the unit interval (q = m; 0 < q < 1) defines the Nakagami-q distribution, also known as Hoyt distribution.
"The radius around the true mean in a bivariate normal random variable, re-written in polar coordinates (radius and angle), follows a Hoyt distribution. Equivalently, the modulus of a complex normal random variable does."
 With 2m = k, the Nakagami distribution gives a scaled chi distribution.
 With , the Nakagami distribution gives a scaled half-normal distribution.
 A Nakagami distribution is a particular form of generalized gamma distribution, with p = 2 and d = 2m

See also 

 Normal distribution
 Gamma distribution
 Modified half-normal distribution
 Normally distributed and uncorrelated does not imply independent
 Reciprocal normal distribution
 Ratio normal distribution
 Standard normal table
 Sub-Gaussian distribution

References 

Continuous distributions